The 1992 Nigerian Senate election in Akwa Ibom State was held on July 4, 1992, to elect members of the Nigerian Senate to represent Akwa Ibom State. Etang Edet Umoyo representing Akwa Ibom South, Akaninyene Ukpanah representing Akwa Ibom North-West and Anietie Okon representing Akwa Ibom North-East all won on the platform of the National Republican Convention.

Overview

Summary

Results

Akwa Ibom South 
The election was won by Etang Edet Umoyo of the National Republican Convention.

Akwa Ibom North-West 
The election was won by Akaninyene Ukpanah of the National Republican Convention.

Akwa Ibom North-East 
The election was won by Anietie Okon of the National Republican Convention.

References 

Akw
Akwa Ibom State Senate elections
July 1992 events in Nigeria